Paalkkadal is a 1976 Indian Malayalam-language film,  directed by T. K. Prasad and produced by K. K. S. Kaimal. The film stars Sheela, Sharada, Mohan Sharma, and Prema. The film has musical score by A. T. Ummer.

Cast

Sheela as Gouri
Sharada as Sujatha
Mohan Sharma as Dharman
Prema as Beevathu
Sankaradi as Mesthiri
Raghavan as Suresh
Bahadoor as Avaran
Kottarakkara Sreedharan Nair as PN Menon
M. G. Soman as Narendran
Manavalan Joseph as Sanku
Kunchan as Office peon
CR Lakshmi as Dharman's mother

Soundtrack
The music was composed by A. T. Ummer with lyrics by Sreekumaran Thampi.

References

External links
 

1976 films
1970s Malayalam-language films